Rod Beaton may refer to:

 Rod Beaton (United Press International) (1923–2002), American journalist and media executive
 Rod Beaton (USA Today) (1951–2011), American sports journalist
 Roderick Beaton (born 1951), British academic